"No Love in the Room" is a song written by Pat McManus and Walt Pedroski and performed by The 5th Dimension.  It reached #11 on the U.S. adult contemporary chart, #41 on the Canadian adult contemporary chart, and #105 on the Billboard chart in 1975.  It was featured on their 1974 album, Soul and Inspiration.

The song was produced by John Florez and arranged by D'Arneill Pershing.

References

1974 songs
1975 singles
The 5th Dimension songs
Songs written by Pat McManus (songwriter)
Arista Records singles